Alice in Chains (occasionally informally referred to as The Dog Album, The Dog Record, and Tripod) is the third studio album by the American rock band Alice in Chains. It was released on November 7, 1995, through Columbia Records, and was the follow-up to the highly successful Dirt (1992). This is the band's first full-length studio album to feature bassist Mike Inez; their last album to feature original lead vocalist Layne Staley, who died in 2002; and their last album to be released on Columbia Records. The album debuted at No. 1 on the Billboard 200 chart with first week sales of 189,000 copies, and stayed on the chart for 46 weeks. The tracks "Grind", "Heaven Beside You" and "Again" were released as singles. "Grind" and "Again" were nominated for the Grammy Award for Best Hard Rock Performance. The album received double platinum certification from the RIAA and has sold over three million copies worldwide. The mockumentary The Nona Tapes was released to promote the album and became a cult hit.

As with their previous releases, the album's songs focus on heavy subject matter such as depression, isolation, drug use, relationships, anger, and death. The band relies less on metallic riffs and more on melody and texturally varied arrangements, integrating some of the more delicate acoustic moods of their EPs. However, the riffs are mostly down-tuned and atonal, employing a strong doom and sludge metal vibe.

Background and recording
After the release of Jar of Flies, vocalist Layne Staley entered rehab for heroin addiction. The band had been scheduled to tour during the summer of 1994 with Metallica, Suicidal Tendencies, Danzig and Fight, but while in rehearsal for the tour, Staley began using heroin again. Staley's condition prompted the other band members to cancel all scheduled dates one day before the start of the tour, putting the band on hiatus. They were replaced by Candlebox on the tour. While Alice in Chains was on hiatus, Staley joined the "grunge supergroup" Mad Season, while guitarist Jerry Cantrell worked on material originally intended for a solo album.

In January 1995, Cantrell, bassist Mike Inez and drummer Sean Kinney began jamming on Cantrell's material. In the spring of 1995, Staley was invited back to join the band. Staley said that "we started to split apart and went different ways, and we felt like we were betraying each other."

In April 1995, Alice in Chains entered Bad Animals Studio in Seattle with producer Toby Wright, who had previously worked with Corrosion of Conformity and Slayer. Few of the songs on the album had been written before the sessions began, so Cantrell's material was used as a starting point. The band would then give the demo tapes to Staley so he could write lyrics. The album was finished in August 1995. Cantrell said, "It was often depressing, and getting it done felt like pulling hair out, but it was the fucking coolest thing, and I'm glad to have gone through it. I will cherish the memory forever," while Staley added, "I'll cherish it forever, too, just because this one I can remember doing."

During the recording of the album, Staley was severely addicted to heroin and was often late or absent for recording and rehearsal sessions. The band's manager Susan Silver said, "...It was a really painful session because it took so long. It was horrifying to see [Layne] in that condition. Yet, when he was cognizant, he was the sweetest, bright-eyed guy you'd ever want to meet. To be in a meeting with him and have him fall asleep in front of you was gut-wrenching."

While in the studio, a rough mix of the song "Grind" was leaked to radio and received major airplay. On October 6, 1995, the band released the studio version of the song to radio via satellite uplink.

Music and lyrics
Cantrell, in an interview with Rolling Stone around the release of the album, said, "Our music's kind of about taking something ugly and making it beautiful."

With the exception of "Grind", "Heaven Beside You", and "Over Now", the lyrics are written entirely by Staley. Staley said, "I just wrote down whatever was on my mind...so a lot of the lyrics are really loose. If you asked me to sing the lyrics to probably any one of them right now, I couldn't do it. I'm not sure what they are because they're still that fresh." Staley added, "For a long time I let problems and sour relationships rule over me instead of letting the water roll off my back...I thought it was cool that I could write such dark, depressing music. But then instead of being therapeutic, it was starting to drag on and keep hurting. This time I just felt, 'Fuck it. I can write good music, and if I feel easy and I feel like laughing, I can laugh.' There's no huge, deep message in any of the songs. It was just what was going on in my head right then. We had good times, and we had bad times. We recorded a few months of being human."

"Sludge Factory" was written about a call Staley and Wright received, while at the studio, from Columbia executives Don Ienner and Michele Anthony. Ienner and Anthony told them they had nine days to finish the record, because they had already taken a lot of studio time.

Of the album's four singles, "Grind", "Heaven Beside You", "Again" and "Over Now", three feature Cantrell on lead vocals, with the exception being "Again". Cantrell also wrote the lyrics for the songs for which he sang lead vocals. Regarding "Grind", Cantrell said it was written "pretty much at the height of publicity about canceled tours, heroin, amputations, everything, thus it was another 'FUCK YOU for saying something about my life' song." "Heaven Beside You" was written by Cantrell after the end of a seven year relationship with his girlfriend. On the liner notes of Alice in Chains' Music Bank box set, Cantrell described the song as "Another attempt to reconcile the fact that my life and paths are tearing me apart from the person I love. All the things I write about her are a way for me to maybe speak to her, express things I could never express." Commenting on "Over Now", Cantrell said of the song: "A lot of deep shit in there, a big epic number. Plus you can get away with a hugely long tune near the end of a record." An acoustic version of "Over Now" was released as a single in 1996 as part of the band's MTV Unplugged album.

Reflecting on the album in a 2018 interview to Noisey, Cantrell said:

Packaging and title
The album is also known informally as "Tripod" or "Three-Legged Dog Album" due to a three-legged dog on the front cover and Frank Lentini on the back. The image of the dog on the cover was inspired by a three-legged dog named Tripod that used to terrorize drummer Sean Kinney and chase him around during his paper-work duty when he was a kid. Kinney also designed the artwork for the album.

Rocky Schenck photographed a three-legged dog for the album cover at a playground near downtown Los Angeles on August 23, 1995. Schenck did a casting for three-legged dogs for the shoot, but the band ended up choosing a fax with the image of a three-legged dog as the cover art because they thought it looked grittier and Staley and Cantrell liked it better. Cantrell has stated that Kinney was "pissed" about that because they spent money for the photoshoot and did not use it for the album cover. A different three-legged dog named Sunshine was used for the "Grind" music video. The photo of the dog shot by Schenck at the playground was finally used years later on the 1999 box set Music Bank. Contrary to rumor, none of the dogs used for the photoshoot, the album cover or the music video belonged to Jerry Cantrell. Cantrell has said in interviews that he did not know the owner of the dog.

The CD was initially available in three versions: one with a transparent purple jewel case with a translucent yellow-green spine, one with the color scheme reversed and a predominantly monochrome version. The purple jewel case is currently out of print and the yellow-green edition is now a rarity. On the predominantly monochrome cover, the dog has yellow eyes. The cassette edition features a transparent purple cassette or transparent yellow-green case. It was also released on double vinyl with a purple label on the A-side and a yellow-green label on the B-side of both discs. Disc 1 featured tracks 1–6, disc 2 featured tracks 7–12, and both discs had 3 tracks per side.

In Japan, the CD cover is replaced with a blank, white cover with the dark blue text "Alice In Chains" appearing inside of a dark blue border in the bottom-right corner. The image of Frank Lentini was also removed, showing a mostly white back cover. The CD was orange.

On July 17, 2019, Schenck revealed on his Instagram account an alternative album cover featuring a three-legged dog and kids playing at a playground.

The Nona Tapes
To help promote the album, Columbia asked the band to do an EPK (Electronic Press Kit), a common marketing tool in the '90s in which they should talk about themselves, but they did not want to do that. The band took the money from the label and made the mockumentary The Nona Tapes instead. Directed by Rocky Schenck, it features Jerry Cantrell disguised as a female journalist, Nona Weisbaum, interviewing his bandmates playing fictionalized versions of themselves during a car ride in Seattle. The music video for "Grind" is also featured at the end. Columbia did not like The Nona Tapes at first and told the band they had wasted their money doing it. However, it became a cult hit and Columbia decided to sell it, but the band was against it. The video was eventually released on VHS in December 1995. In 2006, The Nona Tapes was released on DVD and came as a bonus with the compilation The Essential Alice in Chains.

Release and reception

Although not as successful as Dirt, the album debuted at number one on the Billboard 200 and stayed on the chart for 46 weeks. It has since been certified double platinum by the Recording Industry Association of America for selling over 2 million copies in the United States, and over 3 million copies worldwide. The band opted not to tour in support of Alice in Chains, adding to the rumors of drug abuse. When asked about the frustration of not touring to support the record, Cantrell provided some insight into how Staley's addictions led to repercussive tensions within the band: "Very frustrating, but we stuck it out. We rode the good times together, and we stuck together through the hard times. We never stabbed each other in the back and spilled our guts and do that kind of bullshit that you see happen a lot."

It was noted for being a break away from the externally applied grunge label affixed to the group. Rolling Stone described the album as a "musical rebirth", and The New York Times remarked that in contrast to the raw distortions associated with grunge, Alice in Chains''' sound was "cleanly delineated and meticulously layered." Jon Wiederhorn of Rolling Stone called the album "liberating and enlightening", noting that the songs "achieve a startling, staggering and palpable impact." In reviewing Alice in Chains's discography, Bill Adams of Ground Control Magazine wrote that, "If indeed Jar of Flies turned out to be the gateway that got so many more people hooked on Alice in Chains, it can only be said that the band's self-titled album implies withdrawals or a sense of significant unease or discomfort. The signs that something is just not right appear everywhere both on and in Alice in Chains; the front cover features a photo of a three-legged dog (one too few) while the back cover presents a picture of a three-legged mandolinist (one too many). The album's liner notes feature images of ghastly, contorted fairies with no flesh on their arms, sinister, personified bottles swimming through black oceans, cartoons of mutant animals standing on trial, synthetic limbs and more. They are images of turmoil, disease and discomfort, and it's difficult to look at them."Alice in Chains'' included the singles "Grind", "Heaven Beside You", and "Again", all of which had accompanying music videos. "Grind" and "Again" were nominated for the Grammy Award for Best Hard Rock Performance in 1996 and 1997, respectively. The music video for "Again" was nominated for Best Hard Rock Video at the 1996 MTV Video Music Awards.

Track listing

† Contains an excerpt of "Good Night" by Ted Lewis.
Japanese bonus tracks

Charts

Singles charts

Certifications

Personnel

Alice in Chains
Layne Staley – lead vocals, rhythm guitar on "Head Creeps", guitar parts on "Brush Away"
Jerry Cantrell – lead guitar, rhythm guitar, backing vocals, lead vocals on "Grind", "Heaven Beside You" and "Over Now"
Mike Inez – bass
Sean Kinney – drums

Production
Produced by Toby Wright and Alice in Chains
Recorded by Toby Wright and Tom Nellen, assisted by Sam Hofstedt
Mixed by Toby Wright, assisted by John Seymour
Mastered by Stephen Marcussen
Studio coordinator – Kevan Wilkins
Audio technicians – Darrell Peters, Walter Gemienhardt
Artwork guide – Sean Kinney
Art direction – Mary Maurer
Design – Doug Erb
Photography – Rocky Schenck, Rob Bloch
Management – Susan Silver

References

 

1995 albums
Alice in Chains albums
Albums produced by Toby Wright
Columbia Records albums
Sludge metal albums